Joto, Jōto, or Jōtō may refer to:

 , a former ward in Tokyo City now part of Koto, Tokyo
 Joto High School, Tokushima, Tokushima, Japan, founded in 1902
 Joto language, a dialect of the Banda languages spoken primarily in the Central African Republic
 Jōtō Station (Gunma), Japan
 Jōtō Station (Okayama), Japan
 Joto or Isaiah Crockett, a member of the Teen Titans in the DC Comics universe
 Joto (杖刀), a Japanese swordstick; see Japanese sword mountings#Types of koshirae
 Jōtō-ku, Osaka, one of the 24 wards of Osaka, Japan

See also
 Johto, a region in the fictional Pokémon Gold and Silver